Smartt may refer to:

 Smartt, Tennessee, an unincorporated community in Warren County, Tennessee
 Joseph Smartt (1931–2013), British geneticist and grain legume expert 
 Madison Smartt Bell (born 1957), American novelist
 Mike Smartt (21st century), British journalist
 Stone Smartt (born 1998), American football player
 USS Smartt (DE-257), an Evarts class destroyer escort

See also

 Smart (disambiguation)